John Flannery (born January 25, 1957) is an American former professional baseball right-handed shortstop and third baseman who played in seven games for the Chicago White Sox of the Major League Baseball (MLB) in 1977.

References

External links

1957 births
Living people
Amarillo Gold Sox players
American expatriate baseball players in Canada
Baseball players from Long Beach, California
Birmingham Barons players
Chicago White Sox players
Edmonton Trappers players
Iowa Oaks players
Knoxville Sox players
Major League Baseball shortstops
Major League Baseball third basemen
Quad Cities Angels players
Salinas Angels players